Charles Gywnne "Chuck" Douglas III (born December 2, 1942) is an American politician, jurist, and trial lawyer. He is a former United States Representative from New Hampshire and a New Hampshire Supreme Court associate justice.

Early life
Born in Abington Township, Montgomery County, Pennsylvania, Douglas attended schools in Fort Washington, Pennsylvania. He graduated from William Penn Charter School, Philadelphia, 1960, and attended Wesleyan University from 1960 to 1962, He received a B.A. from University of New Hampshire in 1965 and a J.D. from Boston University School of Law in 1968.

Career
Douglas was admitted to the bar in 1968 and commenced practice in Manchester, Hillsborough County, New Hampshire, from 1970 to 1972. He was legal counsel and legislative counsel to Governor Meldrim Thomson Jr. from 1973 to 1974. He served as associate justice, New Hampshire superior court, from 1974 to 1976, as associate justice, New Hampshire Supreme Court, from 1977 to 1983, and senior justice from 1983 to 1985.

Elected as a Republican to the 101st Congress, Douglas served as United States Representative for the state of New Hampshire from (January 3, 1989 – January 3, 1991). He served as a member of the Committee on the Judiciary from January 3, 1989 to October 28, 1990. He was an unsuccessful candidate for reelection in 1990 to the 102nd Congress.

Douglas has served as an Adjunct Faculty member at University of New Hampshire School of Law and at the American Bar Association's Appellate Judge's Seminars. He has served as Chairman of the New Hampshire Constitution Bicentennial Education Commission and a member of the Constitutional Convention Study Commission.

In addition to publishing over forty articles, Douglas is the author of two books. One, New Hampshire Practice and Procedure: Family Law is the definitive source for New Hampshire Divorce and family law, and is used by New Hampshire divorce and family law attorneys, and is frequently referred to in New Hampshire Supreme Court decisions. He also authored the New Hampshire Evidence Manual. This evidence book is relied upon by New Hampshire lawyers and courts during litigation, and is cited to by the New Hampshire Supreme Court.

, he has been chairman of the Governor's Judicial Selection Commission since 2017. He was chairman of the New Hampshire Judicial Retirement Plan Board of Trustees from 2004 to 2008, and thereafter Executive Director of the Plan. He received a Lifetime Achievement Award from the New Hampshire Association for Justice in 2014 and a Distinguished Service to the Profession Award from the New Hampshire Bar Association in 2017. In 2018 he was named the #1 Personal Injury Trial Lawyer in New Hampshire by N.H. Magazine.

A retired Colonel with the New Hampshire Army National Guard (1968 to 1991), Douglas practices law as the President of Douglas Leonard & Garvey P.C., a seven-attorney, plaintiff's and employment law firm in Concord. He is also the publisher of the Bow Times newspaper in Bow, N.H. where he served on the Town Budget Committee.

Personal life
Because of his experience as a New Hampshire Judge and New Hampshire Supreme Court Justice as well as his record of success as a trial lawyer, Douglas is frequently requested to lecture on personal injury and employment law matters.  He is a resident of Bow, Merrimack County, New Hampshire, and is married to Debra M. Douglas, Chairman of the State's Lottery Commission.

References

External links

Douglas, Leonard & Garvey, P.C.

1942 births
Living people
Boston University School of Law alumni
Justices of the New Hampshire Supreme Court
Wesleyan University alumni
New Hampshire lawyers
Politicians from Concord, New Hampshire
National Guard (United States) colonels
Republican Party members of the United States House of Representatives from New Hampshire
William Penn Charter School alumni
New Hampshire National Guard personnel
People from Bow, New Hampshire
People from Abington Township, Montgomery County, Pennsylvania
Military personnel from Pennsylvania